Music That You Can Dance To is the fourteenth studio album by American pop band Sparks, released in September 1986 by MCA Records in the US and Consolidated Allied Records in the UK, two years after their previous studio album, Pulling Rabbits Out of a Hat (1984).

Background
Music That You Can Dance To was the band's most dance music inspired album since 1979's No. 1 in Heaven. The overall sound of the album was dominated by synthesizers and sequencers like the 1979 studio album but it differed from that release by the inclusion of the heavily distorted bass guitar of Leslie Bohem, and the emphasis on discordant sound effects. "Music That You Can Dance To", "Fingertips" and "The Scene" represent some of Sparks' most Hi-NRG dance music leanings. "Shopping Mall of Love", "Let's Get Funky", and (on the original US edition) "Change" present a side of the band's sound that is discordant and experimental. Whereas "Rosebud" and the rerecording of their 1982 single "Modesty Plays" are not dissimilar from the synth-pop sound that the band had pursued on their previous two studio albums. "Armies of the Night" had been recorded for the supernatural horror film Fright Night (1985); the version that appeared on the European editions of Music That You Can Dance To was a re-recording.

The recording of the album was the last time that the Mael brothers worked with the line-up of guitarist Bob Haag, bassist Leslie Bohem, and drummer David Kendrick. This line-up had been in place since 1981's Whomp That Sucker. Sparks' next studio album, Interior Design (1988), was recorded as a duo with some guest musicians. David Kendrick joined new wave band Devo and appeared on their seventh studio album, Total Devo (1988).

Release
Music That You Can Dance To was no more successful on the album charts than their previous studio album, Pulling Rabbits Out of a Hat (1984), had been. It was released on a number of different record labels across different territories: Consolidated Allied Records in the UK, Curb Records in Germany, and MCA Records in the US, serving as Curb's distributor in the States at that time. In the US and Germany, the album substituted "Armies of the Night" for the 1985 single "Change".

"Music That You Can Dance To", "Rosebud", and "Fingertips" were each released as singles to promote the album. Each was also released as an extended remix. The UK and US remixes of "Music That You Can Dance To" were different. "Fingertips" was released as a club promo in the US and was backed with "The Scene". The club-orientated singles did not register on the mainstream charts, but did make the Billboard Hot Dance Music/Club Play chart; "Music That You Can Dance To" made No. 6 (their highest club chart peak) and the Double A-side "Fingertips"/"The Scene" made No. 38.

"Change" was released in the UK on London Records in 1985 and reached No. 85 on the UK Singles Chart. The standalone single was promoted by an appearance on the British television talk show Wogan. None of the other singles were popular in the UK.

Re-release 
In 1990 Curb Records re-released Music That You Can Dance To under the title The Best of Sparks: Music That You Can Dance To. The release featured a different sleeve and corresponded to the US track listing, with "Change" and not "Armies of the Night". Repertoire Records reissued the album in 2011 with "Armies of the Night" as track four instead of "Change".

Track listing

Personnel
Sparks
 Russell Mael – vocals
 Ron Mael – all synthesizers (Fairlight CMI; Roland Jupiter-8; Yamaha DX7); vocals on "Shopping Mall of Love"
 Bob Haag – Endodyne guitars; Roland synthesizers; backing vocals
 Leslie Bohem – bass guitar; backing vocals
 David Kendrick – drums

Additional personnel
 John Thomas – additional keyboards
 Robert Mache – guitar on "Fingertips"

Production
 Ron Mael – producer
 Russell Mael – producer
 Greg Penny – production on "Modesty Plays (New Version)"

References

External links
 

Sparks (band) albums
1986 albums
Curb Records albums
MCA Records albums
Disques Vogue albums
Repertoire Records albums